Jean Wagner (28 December 1905 – 24 February 1978) was a Luxembourgian athlete. He competed in the men's shot put and the men's discus throw at the 1936 Summer Olympics.

References

External links
 

1905 births
1978 deaths
Athletes (track and field) at the 1936 Summer Olympics
Luxembourgian male shot putters
Luxembourgian male discus throwers
Olympic athletes of Luxembourg
Place of birth missing